Sung-jin, also spelled Seong-jin or Song-jin, is a Korean masculine given name. Its meaning depends on the hanja used to write each syllable of the name. There are 27 hanja with the reading "sung" and 48 hanja with the reading "jin" on the South Korean government's official list of hanja which may be used in given names.

People with this name include:
Pai Sung-jin (fl. 1940s), South Korean man who invented the abacus-like finger-counting method chisanbop
Gong Sung-jin (born 1953), South Korean politician, member of the Grand National Party
Yu Song-jin (born 1964 or 1965), South Korean engineer detained by North Korea for 137 days in 2009
Kang Sung-jin (born 1971), South Korean actor
Skull (singer) (born Park Sung-jin, 1979), South Korean reggae singer
Lee Sung-jin (born 1985), South Korean archer 
Park Sung-jin (born 1985), South Korean football player
Won Seong-jin (born 1985), South Korean go player
Jo Sung-jin (born 1990), South Korean football player
Seong-Jin Cho (born 1994), South Korean pianist

See also
List of Korean given names

References

Korean masculine given names